Arkady Yuryevich Volozh (born 11 February 1964) is a Kazakhstan born Israeli serial technology entrepreneur, computer scientist, investor and philanthropist. He pioneered the development of search and navigation technology as well as intelligent products and services powered by machine learning. Volozh co-founded several IT enterprises, including CompTek, Arkadia, InfiNet and Yandex. Yandex is one of Europe's largest Internet companies, operating Russia's most popular search engine. Yandex is listed in NASDAQ, and was traded at 30+ Billion in November 2021. In June 2022 Volozh, stepped down from all his positions in Yandex and left the company. Volozh has lived in Tel-Aviv with his family since 2015.

Early life
Volozh was born in Guryev, Kazakh SSR, Soviet Union (now Atyrau, Kazakhstan) into a Russian-Jewish family. His father was a petroleum geologist, and his mother was a music teacher. He attended Republican School of Physics and Mathematics in Almaty, Kazakhstan, and then studied applied mathematics at Gubkin Russian State University of Oil and Gas, graduating in 1986.

Career
Volozh is a serial entrepreneur with a background in computer science. After working at a state pipeline research institute, he started a small business importing personal computers from Austria. He went on to co-found several IT enterprises besides Yandex, including a Russian provider of wireless networking technology InfiNet Wireless, and CompTek International, one of the largest distributors of network and telecommunications equipment in Russia.

Volozh co-founded CompTek in 1989. He also started working on search in 1989, which led to him establishing Arkadia Company in 1990. The company was developing search software. In 1993, Arkady Volozh and Ilya Segalovich developed a search engine for "non-structured information with Russian morphology".

Arkady co-founded Yandex in 1997, later leaving his position as CEO of CompTek International to become the CEO of Yandex in 2000.

Yandex, a Nasdaq listed company, developed, and offered a variety of technologies and services under Volozh, in the fields of Ecommerce, navigation, mobility, autonomous vehicles, payments, music, emails and more. The Yandex IPO in 2011 was the largest one until then, after the Google IPO in 2004.In November 2021 the company was valued at 30 billion dollars.

As part of a larger effort to spread machine learning, Volozh and the Yandex team established the Yandex School of Data Analysis in 2007, offering a free master's level program in data science. The program has grown to include six branches, online courses, and other learning programs through multiple partnerships. In 2018, the school opened a branch in Tel Aviv to launch a one-year career advancement program in machine learning.

Resignation from Yandex
On 3 June 2022, the European Union sanctioned Volozh as part of its package of sanctions against Russia as a result of its invasion of Ukraine, citing the role of Yandex in "promoting state media and narratives in its search results" and removing "content related to Russia's war of aggression against Ukraine". The same day, Yandex released a statement saying that Volozh would resign from his posts and step down from the board of directors, effective immediately.

The decision to include Volozh in the sixth sanctions package came as a surprise to many around the world and in Russia. Volozh and his board described the move as misguided and counterproductive. What might have amplified the surprise around the decision is the history of Volozh and his company to refuse to fall in line with the Russian authorities. In 2019 Yandex refused to hand over to the FSB (Russian internal security service) the encrypted keys to its email service. Margarita Simonyan the head of RT (Russian state owned media) described Yandex under Volozh as an antigovernment content promoter. 
It appears the EU decision was based on the Yandex news aggregator service which according to Russian law is obligated to source headlines from officially registered Russian media outlets. After the invasion of Ukraine in 2022 further restrictions were introduced by the Russian government on the local media which turned the news aggregator into a showcase of official Russian messages. The Board of Yandex NV announced its intention to get rid of the news aggregator shortly after the war started. In the summer of 2022, it was confirmed that rival internet group VK took over the news aggregator, while Yandex exited the news aggregation business completely. 

On 30 December, Volozh addressed a farewell message to the company in an internal message, calling the plan to restructure Yandex "reasonable and necessary".

Life in Israel
In 2014, following the Russian annexation of Crimea, Volozh moved to Tel-Aviv, Israel where he lives with his family. His parents also moved to Israel the same year. Volozh's connection to Israel began even long before that - from 2010 to 2012 he served as a board member of Face.com an Israeli facial recognition company which was sold to Facebook in 2012. Volozh was also an investor in the company. From 2015 to 2020 he served as a board member of NeuroSteer, an Israeli company that specialized in brain signal processing and big data analysis. He later moved on to launch a series of services in Israel as well as opening an office and an R&D center in the country. In an interview in 2019 Volozh stated that Israel is a very attractive country, first and foremost because of its human potential, but also because of its role in the global economy. Volozh also frequently appears in professional technological conventions and forums in Israel.

Personal life
In December 2020, his net worth was an estimated . Following the fall of the share price of Yandex stock as a result of the 2022 Russian invasion of Ukraine, Volozh's net worth at the end of February 2022 was estimated to be .

In 2016, Volozh applied for and received Maltese citizenship through its investment program.

 Volozh lives in Tel Aviv with his family, and he an Israeli citizen, according to Wired.

In June 2022, Volozh was sanctioned by European Union.

References

1964 births
Living people
Academic staff of the Moscow Institute of Physics and Technology
People from Atyrau
Russian technology company founders
Yandex people
Russian individuals subject to European Union sanctions